Baroa is a genus of oriental noctuoid moths in the family Erebidae, subfamily Arctiinae.

Species
Baroa peniculata Černý, 2011
Baroa oryza Černý, 2011
Baroa punctibasalis Wileman & West, 1928
Baroa punctivaga Walker, 1855
Baroa siamica Hampson, 1911
Baroa soricina Snellen, 1879
Baroa vatala Swinhoe, 1894

References

External links

Arctiinae
Moth genera